Álvaro Parente (born 4 October 1984) is a Portuguese professional racing driver.

Career

Early career
After winning the Karting European Junior Championship in 1998, Porto-born Parente made his debut in auto racing in 2001 at the age of 16, driving in the Spanish F3 Championship. In the following year, he was integrated into the Team Portugal project and scored a win on his way to 4th place in the series.

Formula Three
Parente than began a more international career in 2003, moving to the F3 Euroseries with Team Ghinzani, but the Mugen-Honda engine proved to be inferior to the Mercedes and he scored a single point. He did better with one-off entries in Italian Formula 3 and at Spa in a round of the British Formula 3 Championship, his first association with Carlin Motorsport, which was repeated that year in the Macau Grand Prix.

This brief contact paved the way for a contract with Carlin for the 2004 season, where he took part in the British series, scoring another win and finishing 7th in the championship standings. He also took part in the Marlboro Masters and at Macau, but in the former the Mugen-Honda could not take the fight to the Mercedes drivers and in the latter he was taken out in the first lap.

Parente stayed in the British Formula 3 for another season, and his experience helped him to win the championship with four races to go, scoring a total of 11 wins. This result made him the natural candidate to represent A1 Team Portugal for the new A1 Grand Prix series.

Formula Renault 3.5 Series
For 2006, Parente joined the Formula Renault 3.5 Series with the Victory Engineering team, and achieved his first win at Istanbul in only his fifth race in the category. He took two further wins at the Nürburgring and Circuit de Catalunya to finish fifth in the final standings. He had hoped to progress onto the GP2 Series in 2007, but a lack of sponsorship scuppered his plans. He did, however, return to the Formula Renault 3.5 Series with the French Tech 1 Racing team, having signed a contract on the eve of the first pre-season test.

During the 2007 season Parente took five podium finishes, including two race victories at Monaco and Spa, and was crowned World Series by Renault champion at the final round in Barcelona on 27 October.

As a prize for winning the Formula Renault 3.5 Series, Parente has tested for the Renault F1 team on 17 January 2008 at the Circuito de Jerez.

GP2 Series
For 2008 Parente moved to the Super Nova Racing team in the GP2 Series, widely regarded as the primary feeder series to Formula One.

Alvaro Parente made a stunning start to his GP2 career in the opening round of the season at the Circuit de Catalunya, Parente won the feature race making him the first Portuguese driver to win in GP2 Series. Alvaro Parente led from start to finish, to claim victory ahead of Bruno Senna and Andreas Zuber. He eventually finished eighth in the drivers' championship.

Super Nova team nicknamed Parente as "Chachi", due to his likeness to the famous character in Happy Days.

In 2009 Parente participated in the GP2 Asia Series with My Team Qi.Meritus, and competed in the GP2 Series with Ocean Racing Technology, finishing eighth once again.

Parente began the 2010 season without a drive, but replaced Alberto Valerio at the Coloni team from the Belgian round onwards. On his return to the category, he scored a double podium finish, and ended the weekend as the highest scoring driver. He was replaced for the final round by James Jakes.

Parente again went into the 2011 GP2 Series season without a drive, but was called up by Racing Engineering for the second round of the championship at Catalunya. He replaced Christian Vietoris, who had complained of recurring headaches following a heavy crash at the first round in Turkey. Vietoris returned after two rounds, but Parente remained in the series by switching to the Carlin team, where he took the seat previously occupied by Oliver Turvey. After a further six races, he relinquished the seat to Mikhail Aleshin. He then returned for the season finale at Monza, ending up in 16th place in the drivers' championship.

Superleague Formula
Parente agreed to race at the 2009 Estoril round of the 2009 Superleague Formula season for his football squad team, F.C. Porto, and went on to win the second race, on his series debut.

Formula One
Parente was a leading contender for a seat at Campos Meta, other contenders were Vitaly Petrov and Pastor Maldonado.
On 15 December 2009, it was officially announced that Parente would join the new Virgin Racing team as a test driver. However, he was not present at the launch of the VR-01 chassis in February 2010, and it was reported that he had left the team due to sponsorship problems. Andy Soucek replaced Parente as the reserve driver.

GT
Since 2012, Parente has regularly been a factory GT3 driver for McLaren customer teams. His highlight was winning the 2016 Liqui Moly Bathurst 12 Hour for Tekno Autosports alongside Shane van Gisbergen and Jonathon Webb as well as taking the 2016 Pirelli World Challenge Championship title. He has also competed in the 24 Hours of Le Mans in 2012 for Ram Racing in a Ferrari 458 Italia GT2.

Racing record

Career summary

† Guest driver ineligible to score points

‡ Team standings.

Complete Formula 3 Euro Series results
(key) (Races in bold indicate pole position) (Races in italics indicate fastest lap)

† Driver did not finish the race, but was classified as he completed over 90% of the race distance.

Complete A1 Grand Prix results
(key) (Races in bold indicate pole position) (Races in italics indicate fastest lap)

Complete Formula Renault 3.5 Series results
(key) (Races in bold indicate pole position) (Races in italics indicate fastest lap)

Complete GP2 Series results
(key) (Races in bold indicate pole position) (Races in italics indicate fastest lap)

Complete GP2 Asia Series results
(key) (Races in bold indicate pole position) (Races in italics indicate fastest lap)

FIA GT competition results

GT1 World Championship results

FIA GT Series results

Complete Blancpain GT Series Sprint Cup results

Complete Stock Car Brasil results

† Ineligible for championship points.

Complete FIA World Endurance Championship results
(key) (Races in bold indicate pole position; races in
italics indicate fastest lap)

24 Hours of Le Mans results

Complete Bathurst 12 Hour results

References

External links

 Official Blog
 
 

1984 births
Living people
Sportspeople from Porto
Portuguese racing drivers
Euroformula Open Championship drivers
Formula 3 Euro Series drivers
British Formula Three Championship drivers
A1 Team Portugal drivers
GP2 Series drivers
GP2 Asia Series drivers
Superleague Formula drivers
World Series Formula V8 3.5 drivers
FIA GT1 World Championship drivers
Blancpain Endurance Series drivers
International GT Open drivers
Stock Car Brasil drivers
FIA World Endurance Championship drivers
24 Hours of Le Mans drivers
24 Hours of Spa drivers
ADAC GT Masters drivers
24 Hours of Daytona drivers
WeatherTech SportsCar Championship drivers
Carlin racing drivers
GT World Challenge America drivers
Australian Endurance Championship drivers
A1 Grand Prix drivers
Italian Formula Three Championship drivers
Nürburgring 24 Hours drivers
Racing Engineering drivers
Victory Engineering drivers
Tech 1 Racing drivers
Team Meritus drivers
Scuderia Coloni drivers
Ocean Racing Technology drivers
United Autosports drivers
Bhaitech drivers
ART Grand Prix drivers
Teo Martín Motorsport drivers
Strakka Racing drivers
Meyer Shank Racing drivers
Sébastien Loeb Racing drivers
Mercedes-AMG Motorsport drivers
CRS Racing drivers
Team Astromega drivers
De Villota Motorsport drivers
Super Nova Racing drivers
AF Corse drivers
McLaren Racing drivers